Keelapuliyur is a settlement in Tamil Nadu, India.

References

Cities and towns in Perambalur district